Prof. Suyanto, Ph.D. (born 2 March 1953) is a professor and technocrat from Indonesia. He had been a rector of Yogyakarta State University and Director General for Management of Primary and Secondary Education in Indonesian Ministry of Education and Culture. He is also known as a writer and speaker in education. His current positions are as a Vice Chairman of Majelis Pendidikan Tinggi Pimpinan Pusat Muhammadiyah and Chairman of Alumni Association of Yogyakarta State University.

Education 
 Doctor of Philosophy (Michigan State University, 1986)

Career 
 Chairman of Alumni Association of Yogyakarta State University (2014–2018)
 Vice Chairman of Majelis Pendidikan Tinggi Pimpinan Pusat Muhammadiyah (2000–2015)
 Acting Director General for Primary Education in Indonesian Ministry of Education and Culture (2010–2013)
 Director General for Management of Primary and Secondary Education in Indonesian Ministry of Education and Culture (2005–2010)
 Rector of Yogyakarta State University (1999–2006)
 Secretary of Yogyakarta State University Postgraduate Program (1997–1999)
 Consultant of Asia Development Bank (ADB) (1997–1998)
 Consultant of World Bank (1994, 1996)
 Professor in Yogyakarta State University

Publications

Books 
 Buku Panduan Media Pembelajaran Literasi Keuangan Robot Need & Want
 Betapa Mudah Menyusun Tulisan Ilmiah (Esensi, 2016)
 Menjadi Guru Profesional: Strategi Meningkatkan Kualifikasi dan Kualitas Guru di Era Global (Esensi, 2013)
 Bagaimana Menjadi Calon Guru dan Guru Profesional (Multi Pressindo, 2013)
 Wajib Belajar 9 Tahun untuk Masa Depan yang Lebih Baik (Ditjen Dikdas Kemdikbud RI, 2013)
 Hidup Mati RSBI: Boleh Bubar, Virus Kualitasnya Tetap Menyabar (Ditjen Dikdas Kemdikbud RI, 2013)
 Bantuan Siswa Miskin: Strategi Jitu Menyukseskan Wajib Belajar 9 Tahun di Indonesia (Ditjen Dikdas Kemdikbud RI, 2013) 
 Betapa Mudah Menulis Karya Ilmiah (Eduka, 2009)
 Dialog Interaktif tentang Pendidikan: dari Konseptual, Menggelitik, sampai yang Ringan dan Ringan Sekali (Multi Pressindo, 2008)
 Dinamika Pendidikan Nasional dalam Percaturan Dunia Global (PSAP Muhammadiyah, 2006)
 Wajah dan Dinamika Pendidikan Anak Bangsa (Adicita Karya Nusa, 2001)
 Refleksi dan Reformasi Pendidikan di Indonesia Memasuki Milenium III (Adicita Karya Nusa, 2000)
 Pokok-Pokok Pembelajaran Pendidikan Ekonomi di SLTP (Departemen Pendidikan Nasional, 2000)
 Belajar: Perkembangan Teori dan Kegiatannya (Yayasan Penerbit FKIS-IKIP Yogyakarta, 1983)

Video 
 Video Pembelajaran Literasi Keuangan Need and Want

International publications 
 Teachers’ Burnout: A SEM Analysis in an Asian Context (Heliyon, Volume 6 Issue 1 January 2020)
 Human Resource Management for Improving Internationalization at a Private University in Yogyakarta, Indonesia (Mediterranean Journal of Social Sciences, Vol. 10 No. 2 March 2019, Indexed by SCOPUS)
 Bringing Voluntary Financial Education in Emerging Economy: Role of Financial Socialization During Elementary Years (The Asia-Pacific Education Researcher, Volume 22/2013 - Volume 26/2017, Indexed by ISI-Thomson)
 Evidence of Private Wage Returns to Schooling in Indonesia from Labor Force Surveys (Actual Problems of economics No. #2 (188), 2017, Indexed by Scopus)
 Indonesia’s School Operational Assistance Program (BOS): Challenges in Embedding Results-Based Approach (Seoul, 22–23 Oktober 2012)
 Enriching Future Generation: Education Promoting Indonesian Self-Development (Yogyakarta; UNY dan Yale University, 27 Juni 2011)
 Technical and Vocational School Development Strategy in Indonesia (Istanbul, 18 – 20 Juni 2009)
 Bridging The Education Gap:  Improving Access, Equity, And Quality (The Case Of Indonesia) (Kuala Lumpur, 13–14 Maret 2008)
 Regional Perspective on Current Initiatives and Opportunities for E-9 Teacher Networking: Indonesia – China (Seventh E-9 Ministerial Review Meeting, 10–12 Maret 2008)
 Road Map 2006 – 2010: Policies in the Development of Technical Vocational School in Indonesia (Hanoi, 12 Januari 2008)
 Primary and Secondary School Management: Challenges and Opportunities (Jakarta, 30 Juli 2007)
 Indonesian Education in Comparison Of South East Asian Countries (Yogyakarta, 10 December 2004)
 Strategy of Sport Development within the Frame Work of Local Autonomy: The Case of Indonesia (Yogyakarta, 10 September 2003)
 Dialogue Among the Civilizations: The Role of Universities, Country Perspective:  Indonesia (Korea, 20 – 23 November 2002)
 A Glance at the Indonesian Educational System (Yogyakarta, 5-6 Februari 2002)
 Education for Tolerance and Human Rights: Building Socio-Pedagogical Models for Indonesian Harmony in Diversity (Yogyakarta, 16 Juli 2001)
 National Education Reform Agenda: The Principles of Change (Jakarta, 5 Juli 2001)

National publications 
 Dampak Bantuan Operasional Sekolah (BOS) di Madrasah Tsanawiyah

Award 
 Joon S. Moon Distinguished International Alumni

Footnotes

External links 
  Alumni Professional Development Activity – Malang, Australiaawardsindonesia.org
  Prof. Suyanto Ph.D.: Negara Takkan Bangkrut untuk Pendidikan, Suaramerdeka.com
  Dirjen Manajemen Pendidikan Dasar dan Menengah Serahkan Dana Darurat Rehabilitasi Sekolah Korban Merapi, Slemankab.go.id
  Arah Kebijakan Pendidikan Indonesia pada Era MEA, Fe.uny.ac.id
  Penyelenggaraan Sekolah Pasca Berlakunya UU Badan Hukum Pendidikan, Dikdas.kemdikbud.go.id
  Peluncuran Buku Prof. Suyanto, harian Suara Merdeka edisi 26 September 2006.
  Integritas Pendidikan, Ispi.or.id

Living people
1953 births
Indonesian Muslims
Yogyakarta State University
Indonesian writers
Academic staff of Yogyakarta State University
Michigan State University alumni